Chad Lemar Bumphis (born October 18, 1989) is an American football coach and former wide receiver. He is currently the wide receivers coach at Mississippi State University.  

Bumphis was signed as an undrafted free agent by the Miami Dolphins in 2013. He played college football at Mississippi State University, where he holds the school record for career receiving touchdowns.  He also held the school record for receiving yards until he was passed by Fred Ross.

Professional career

Miami Dolphins
He was signed by the Miami Dolphins on May 3, 2013. He was waived on August 31, 2013.

Denver Broncos
He was signed to the Denver Broncos' practice squad on October 22, 2013. He was waived on November 28, 2013.

Jacksonville Jaguars
He was signed to the Jacksonville Jaguars' practice squad on December 9, 2013. He was signed to the active roster at the conclusion of the 2013 regular season. The Jaguars released Bumphis on August 29, 2014.

Edmonton Eskimos
Bumphis was signed by the Edmonton Eskimos to their practice roster on October 9, 2014.

References

External links
Jacksonville Jaguars bio
Mississippi State Bulldogs bio

1989 births
Living people
American football wide receivers
Denver Broncos players
Edmonton Elks players
Miami Dolphins players
Mississippi State Bulldogs football players
Mississippi State University alumni
Jacksonville Jaguars players
Sportspeople from Tupelo, Mississippi
Tupelo High School alumni
Players of American football from Mississippi